The 1986–87 Scottish Second Division was won by Meadowbank Thistle who, along with second placed Raith Rovers, were promoted to the First Division. Berwick Rangers finished bottom.

Table

Promoted: Meadowbank Thistle, Raith Rovers

References

Scottish Second Division seasons
3
Scot